Isa ibn Luqman al-Jumahi was an eighth century official of the Abbasid Caliphate.

A member of the Jumah clan of the Quraysh, he seems to have been a descendant of a rather undistinguished family. He was appointed governor of Kufa by the caliph al-Mahdi in 775–776. In 778 he was made governor of Egypt, and held that position for four months until early 779 when he was dismissed in favor of Wadih.

Notes

References
 
 
 
 

Abbasid governors of Egypt
8th-century Arabs
8th-century Abbasid governors of Egypt